James Harrison Jones (born January 2, 1953) is a Canadian former professional ice hockey player. He played for the Toronto Maple Leafs of the National Hockey League between 1977 and 1979. He also played for the Vancouver Blazers of the World Hockey Association between 1973 and 1975.

Playing career
Jones was drafted by the Boston Bruins in the 1973 NHL Amateur Draft, as well as the Vancouver Blazers in the 1973 WHA Amateur Draft. He began his professional career with the Blazers the following season. After playing parts of two seasons with the Blazers he signed a contract with the American Hockey League's Rochester Americans.

He played in the National Hockey League for the first time in 1977, after signing a contract with the Toronto Maple Leafs on the October 25. He played two seasons on the Maple Leafs' checking line with Jerry Butler and Pat Boutette.

He returned to the Americans in 1980, playing one final season before retiring in 1981.

Career statistics

Regular season and playoffs

External links
 

1953 births
Living people
Boston Bruins draft picks
Canadian ice hockey right wingers
Ice hockey people from Ontario
New Brunswick Hawks players
People from Vaughan
Peterborough Petes (ice hockey) players
Roanoke Valley Rebels (SHL) players
Rochester Americans players
Toronto Maple Leafs players
Tulsa Oilers (1964–1984) players
Vancouver Blazers draft picks
Vancouver Blazers players